Interiors is the seventh studio album by American country music singer Rosanne Cash. The album was released on October 5, 1990, as her sixth album for Columbia Records. The album accounted for her last appearances on the Hot Country Songs charts: "What We Really Want" reached number 39, and "On the Surface" reached number 69.

Track listing

The Full Sessions (1990) bonus tracks
<li>"Portrait" (Cash, Keith Sykes) – 3:48
<li>"All Come True" (Karl Wallinger) – 5:20

Reissue bonus tracks
<li>"This World" (live) (Cash) – 4:09
<li>"What We Really Want" (acoustic) (Rosanne Cash) – 3:34

Personnel
Rosanne Cash: vocals
Vince Melamed: piano, keyboards
Maura O'Connell: violin, background vocals
Rodney Crowell: guest vocal
Mark O'Connor: mandolin
Jerry Douglas: electric slide guitar, dobro
Edgar Meyer: Areo bass
Pat Flynn: acoustic guitar
Eddie Bayers: drums
Jim Hanson: bass, background vocals
Steuart Smith: electric and acoustic guitar
Richard Bennett: acoustic guitar, mandolin guitar O Phone
Vince Santoro: tambourine, cardboard box, background vocals
Barbara Santoro: background vocals
Michael Rhodes: bass, upright bass, Washburn acoustic bass
John Stewart: acoustic guitar
Michael Lawler: keyboards
Tommy Spurlock: steel guitar
Michael Blustone: shaker
Jim Photoglo: background vocals
Kristen DeLauer: background vocals
John Barlow Jarvis: piano, keyboards
John Leventhal: guitar
Larry Campbell: mandolin
Clifford Carter: keyboards
Zev Katz: bass
Dennis McDermott: drums

Charts

Weekly charts

Year-end charts

References

Rosanne Cash albums
1990 albums
Columbia Records albums